Sumitra Devi Kasdekar is an Indian politician. She was elected to the Madhya Pradesh Legislative Assembly from Nepanagar. She was an elected member of the Madhya Pradesh Legislative Assembly as a member of the Indian National Congress. She left the Indian National Congress in August 2020 and on the same day, she joined Bharatiya Janata Party.

References

Madhya Pradesh MLAs 2018–2023
Bharatiya Janata Party politicians from Madhya Pradesh
1983 births
Living people
People from Burhanpur district
Indian National Congress politicians from Madhya Pradesh